Robin Gordon Stevens (born 30 January 1960) is an English puppeteer, actor, director, and writer for children's TV for over 35 years, and has done many successful programmes. These include Pob's Programme, Corners, Teletubbies, Rosie and Jim, Tots TV, Boohbah, and Blips.

Early life
Stevens was born in the UK in Chorleywood. He trained at the Cannon Hill Puppet Theater for four years with John Blundall, the world-famous puppet master.

Career
Stevens worked for Ragdoll Productions for about 20 years, at times co-writing scripts and originating content with Alan Dapre. He also worked for the BBC, puppeteering Jo Corner on Corners. He puppeteered Pob in Pob's Programme, Jim in Rosie and Jim, Tom in Tots TV (he also wrote the scripts with Tiny's puppeteer Andrew Davenport), and The Man in the Magic House in Teletubbies (he voiced the man in all foreign dubs except for the PBS Kids version where US actress Dena Davis redubbed the voice). Stevens also played Grandpappa in Boohbah and Mr. Perfect in Blips.

References

External links 
 
 

English puppeteers
English male television actors
Living people
1960 births
Male actors from Hertfordshire
People from Chorleywood
English television writers
British male television writers